The North Carolina United States Senate election of 1972 was held on 7 November 1972 as part of the nationwide elections to the Senate, and coinciding with the 1972 presidential election.  The general election was fought between the Republican nominee Jesse Helms and the Democratic nominee Rep. Nick Galifianakis. Helms won the election, becoming the first Republican to win a Senate seat in North Carolina in the twentieth century.

Three-term Representative Nick Galifianakis defeated two-term incumbent Senator B. Everett Jordan in the second ballot in the Democratic primary.  Galifianakis was seen as an anti-establishment liberal in North Carolina, although an opponent of busing.

Democratic primary

Candidates
J. R. Brown
Nick Galifianakis, U.S. Representative from Durham
Eugene Grace
B. Everett Jordan, incumbent Senator since 1958

Results

Runoff

Republican primary

Candidates
William Booe, former member of the Charlotte School Board
Jesse Helms, WRAL-TV executive and commentator and former Democratic member of the Raleigh City Council
James Johnson, State Representative from Greensboro

Results

General election

Results

Footnotes

1972
North Carolina
Jesse Helms
1972 North Carolina elections